Vera Martelli (27 October 1930 – 13 May 2017) was an Italian sprinter. She competed in the women's 200 metres at the 1952 Summer Olympics.

References

External links
 

1930 births
2017 deaths
Athletes (track and field) at the 1952 Summer Olympics
Italian female sprinters
Olympic athletes of Italy
Place of birth missing
Olympic female sprinters